1964 Speedway World Team Cup was the fifth edition of the FIM Speedway World Team Cup to determine the team world champions. 

The final took place in Abensberg, West Germany. The World Champion title was won by Sweden (34 pts) who beat Soviet Union (27 pts), Great Britain (21 pts) and Poland (16 pts).

Format

* Great Britain seeded to the final

Qualification

Continental Semi-Final 1

 May 25
  Nowa Huta, Kraków

Continental Semi-Final 2

 May 25
  Svestosarevo

Scandinavian Round
 June 6
  Hillerød

Continental Final
  Lviv
(Yugoslavia replaced Bulgaria)

World final
  Abensberg, Abensberg Speedwaystadion

See also
 1964 Individual Speedway World Championship
 motorcycle speedway

References

1964
World Team